The 1931 Tulsa Golden Hurricane football team represented the University of Tulsa during the 1931 college football season. In their seventh year under head coach Gus Henderson, the Golden Hurricane compiled an 8–3 record and outscored their opponents by a total of 256 to 55.

Schedule

References

Tulsa
Tulsa Golden Hurricane football seasons
Tulsa Golden Hurricane football